Willem van Rhijn (10 April 1903 – 10 January 1979) was a Dutch modern pentathlete. He competed at the 1928 and 1932 Summer Olympics.

References

External links
 

1903 births
1979 deaths
Dutch male modern pentathletes
Olympic modern pentathletes of the Netherlands
Modern pentathletes at the 1928 Summer Olympics
Modern pentathletes at the 1932 Summer Olympics
Sportspeople from Bergen op Zoom